Elvio Mana (born 1955) is an Argentine football player.

Mana began his playing career with Quilmes and appeared in nine Primera Division Argentina matches for the club. He moved to Greece where he had spells with Kalamata, Panachaiki and Kavala in the Alpha Ethniki.

Following his playing career, Mana became a manager for Kalamata.

References

1955 births
Living people
Argentine footballers
Quilmes Atlético Club footballers
Kalamata F.C. players
Panachaiki F.C. players
Kavala F.C. players
Association football defenders
Argentine football managers